Con Safos (With Respect) is an album by Ruben and the Jets. The title of the album is a graffiti tag used by Mexican-American graffiti artists to discourage other graffiti artists from painting over or altering their graffiti, sometimes painted as "c/s".

Released in 1974, the album is the second and final release to feature the lineup led by musician Rubén Guevara Jr. The album's eclectic sound draws from genres such as blues, rhythm and blues, progressive rock and rock and roll.

Track listing 
Side one
"Cruisin' Down Broadway" - 3:20
"To Be Loved" - 3:07
"Stronger" (preview) - 0:32
"Speedoo" - 3:31 (Esther Navarro)
"Honky Tonk" - 3:45
"Low Ridin' Cruiser" - 3:27
Side two
"Stronger" - 3:35
"Earth to Buffalo" - 1:09
"I Wanna Know" - 3:08
"Honky Tonk" (replay) - 0:49
"Dust My Blues" - 2:47 (Robert Johnson, credited to Elmore James)
"A Thousand Miles Away/You Send Me" - 3:01
"Durango" - 4:16

Personnel
Personnel adapted from AllMusic.
 Ruben and the Jets
 Rubén Guevara Jr. – vocals, tambourine, keyboards
 Tony Duran – guitar, keyboards, vocals
 Robert "Frog" Camarena – rhythm guitar, vocals
 Robert "Buffalo" Roberts – tenor saxophone
 Bill Wild – bass guitar, tenor vocals
 Bob Zamora – drums
 Jim Sherwood – baritone saxophone, tambourine

References

1974 albums
Ruben and the Jets albums
Mercury Records albums